Kaķis ("a cat") is the seventh album by Latvian band Dzeltenie Pastnieki, released in 2003. It was their first album of new material in 16 years, and the first release, of any kind, in 8 years.

Track listing
"Kaķa dziesma" (Ingus Baušķenieks/Roberts Gobziņš/Viesturs Slava/Zigmunds Streiķis) – 5:11
"Tagad ir tagad" (Baušķenieks/Gobziņš/Slava/Streiķis) – 4:59
"Par sievieti-karotāju – I" (Baušķenieks/Slava/Streiķis) – 0:35
"Portfelis ar pīrādziņu" (Baušķenieks/Slava/Streiķis) – 4:37
"Gaisa sīnusi" (Baušķenieks/Gobziņš/Slava/Streiķis) – 5:24
"Mirklis" (Baušķenieks/Slava/Streiķis) – 4:51
"Pārlaidies" (Baušķenieks/Slava/Streiķis) – 6:39
"Haizivs un delfīns" (Baušķenieks/Gobziņš/Slava/Streiķis) – 5:19
"Par sievieti-karotāju – II" (Baušķenieks/Slava/Streiķis) – 4:35
"Kur mana mīlestība aiziet?" (Baušķenieks/Gobziņš/Slava/Streiķis) – 5:32
"Vakara zupa" (Baušķenieks/Andris Kalniņš/Mārtiņš Rutkis/Slava/Streiķis) – 0:49
"Kā balons, kā vējš" (Baušķenieks/Slava/Streiķis) – 4:33

Credits
Band - Ingus Baušķenieks, Viesturs Slava, Zigmunds Streiķis
Illustrations - Anete Baušķeniece
Kaķis logo - Matīss Baušķenieks
Sax solo on track 7 - Uģis Vītiņš

Release history

References

External links 
 Kaķis at Discogs

2003 albums
Dzeltenie Pastnieki albums